"Jeepster" is a song by English glam rock act T. Rex. It was released on 5 November 1971 by record label Fly as a single from the group's sixth studio album (and second as T. Rex) Electric Warrior. The B-side, "Life's a Gas", is taken from the same album. Several artists have recorded cover versions of it. Both of the single's tracks were written by Marc Bolan and produced by Tony Visconti.

Release
Originally, "Jeepster" and "Life's a Gas" were pressed up together on 7 inch vinyl as a limited edition promotional disc for Electric Warrior. The disc was upgraded to a fully promoted single with "Jeepster" as the A side on 5 November 1971 by record label Fly. The single peaked at No. 2 in the UK Singles Chart, and was controversial in that Fly Records promoted the song to hit status without singer Marc Bolan's prior permission, Bolan having just left Fly for EMI, which had given him control of his own label T. Rex Wax Co. Records. The song reached No. 28 in Australia and No. 73 in Canada.  It was beaten to No. 1 in the UK Singles Chart by "Coz I Luv You" by Slade for its first week at No.2 before being blocked from the top place by "Ernie (The Fastest Milkman in the West)" by Benny Hill for the remaining four weeks.

"Jeepster" is widely regarded as one of the band's best songs. Billboard and Paste ranked the song number three and number one, respectively, on their lists of the top 10 T. Rex songs.

Cover versions
 Scottish band Altered Images covered the song and it appears on their Happy Birthday Plus album.
 English band the Polecats covered the song and released it as a 7" single in 1981, which reached No. 53 on the UK Singles Chart.
 Former Marillion singer Fish covered the song as one of his personal favourites for his album Songs from the Mirror, released in 1993.
 American rock supergroup Hollywood Vampires, formed in 2015 by Alice Cooper, Johnny Depp and Joe Perry to honor the music of the rock stars who died from excess in the 1970s, included the song on their 2015 debut album Hollywood Vampires, to commemorate Marc Bolan's death on 16 September 1977.
Chad Smith and Josh Klinghoffer of Red Hot Chili Peppers recorded a cover, along with another T. Rex track ("Monolith") for a 2019 Record Store Day 7" release.
 Joan Jett & the Blackhearts performed this on the Marc Bolan anthology of cover versions Angelheaded Hipster: The Songs of Marc Bolan & T. Rex, released in 2020.

Television
Bolan was a guest on the BBC Television show, Cilla, in January 1973. He and Cilla Black sang an acoustic version of "Life's a Gas".

References

External links
 

1971 songs
1971 singles
T. Rex (band) songs
The Polecats songs
Songs written by Marc Bolan
Song recordings produced by Tony Visconti
Fly Records singles